Wendle is a surname. Notable people with the surname include:

Annika Wendle (born 1997), German wrestler
Joey Wendle (born 1990), American baseball player

See also
Wendel (name), given name and surname
Weddle, surname